Radio Kladanj is a Bosnian local public radio station, broadcasting from Kladanj, Bosnia and Herzegovina.

It was launched on 8 May 1992 by JU "IKC" Kladanj, Kladanj. This radio station broadcasts a variety of programs such as music, talk shows and local news.

Program is mainly produced in Bosnian language. Estimated number of potential listeners of Radio Kladanj is around 72.767.

Frequencies
 Kladanj

See also 
List of radio stations in Bosnia and Herzegovina

References

External links 
 www.fmscan.org
 www.kladanj.ba
 Communications Regulatory Agency of Bosnia and Herzegovina

Kladanj
Radio stations established in 1992